Allentown, Pennsylvania is the largest city in the Lehigh Valley, the third largest city in Pennsylvania, and the county seat of Lehigh County. The city includes several neighborhoods, districts, and other places, though these neighborhoods and districts are only informally defined.

Center City

 7th Street(North 7th Street from the city line to the north through Linden Street to the south)7th Street is a retail and residential corridor just north of Center City Allentown. It is Allentown's fastest growing commercial corridor and serves as the primary gateway to the city with an improving appearance over the last few years through new street lights, planters and waste receptacles. Neighborhood service establishments and family-owned ethnic restaurants dominate business on 7th Street. A small colony of artists have begun to settle in this area of Allentown. 7th Street revitalization is organized by local volunteer citizen committees through a Main Street Program, 7th Street Allentown  This program is a result of the City of Allentown participating in the State sponsored Main Street program for the area of North 7th Street between Linden and Washington Streets as a main street. The Seventh Street Development Committee (SSDC) acts as the program's advisory body, and the Community Action Development Corporation-Allentown manages the program. The program follows the National Main Street Center's Four Point Approach of organization, economic restructuring, promotion, and design to structure the SSDC's comprehensive strategy. The SSDC follows an annual work plan and is assisted by a Main Street Manager.
 Downtown(4th through 12th Streets to the east and west, and Walnut through Linden Streets to the south and north)Downtown Allentown is the city’s central business district. It is home to several large employers such as PPL Corporation and The Morning Call and is host to city, county, and federal government centers. While downtown is no longer considered the premier regional shopping destination of the Lehigh Valley, dozens of small businesses and several prominent restaurants and nightclubs, including Robato of Tokyo, The Bay Leaf, the Allentown Brewworks, the Sterling, and others are located here. An ongoing effort to revitalize this area is progressing partially through the introduction of high-end loft apartments and townhouses, as well as an application to the commonwealth by the city and the Chamber of Commerce for "Main Street" designation. Downtown Allentown has been the beneficiary of the NIZ (Neighborhood Improvement Zone), a tax increment financing district that financed the construction of the PPL Arena at 7th and Hamilton as well as numerous other buildings in Center City.
 Arts District  One of the anchors of downtown Allentown is its arts district between North 5th and North 6th Streets. The district is home to fine cultural arts and entertainment venues such as the Allentown Art Museum, the Baum School of Art, Allentown Symphony Hall, and most recently the Allentown Arts Park. The Arts District Master Plan was completed in 2004 for the purpose of providing a strategy for the district to grow and further develop its potential.
 Jordan Creek (North of Tilghman)(Jordan Creek through 7th Street east to west north of Tilghman Street to the city line)This area is mainly residential.  This area has had historically higher poverty rates than the surrounding neighborhoods. Prices of properties here are especially affordable and in recent years this neighborhood has been a magnet for working artists.

 Old Allentown Historic District(8th through 12th Streets east to west, and Linden through Liberty Streets south to north)The Old Allentown Historic District was established on September 6, 1978 by City Ordinance #12314 and was certified by the Pennsylvania State Historical and Museum Commission on September 26, 1978. The neighborhood was laid out in the original plan for Allentown by order of William Allen in 1762, and developed as the City grew northward and westward and today contains a mix Federal, Italianate, Eastlake and Victorian housing styles. Old Allentown now is also the home of the United Way's Allentown Promise Neighborhood initiative, modeled on the work of Geoffrey Canada and the Harlem Children's Zone. The Allentown Promise Neighborhood takes a systems approach to improving the academic performance and the college and career readiness of the children in its nine block area.

The City, in association with the Old Allentown Preservation Association, is a participant in the Commonwealth of Pennsylvania's Elm Street program. Covering the Old Allentown neighborhood, the Elm Street program's goals are to:

 Revitalize neighborhoods in proximity to the existing downtown by improving the exterior appearance of the buildings and streetscape.
 Formalize a connection between established residential neighborhood areas with downtown revitalization activities.
 Prevent neighborhood decline by developing a plan that includes the establishment of a sustainable community organization that will implement a five-year strategy.
 Assist municipalities in preparing and implementing a revitalization strategy for established residential neighborhoods either in the vicinity of a Main Street Program project or in proximity to an existing commercial district.
 The Old Allentown program has an Advisory Committee that executes an annual work plan based on the Old Allentown Neighborhood Improvement Plan, prepared with the assistance of the Bureau of Planning. The program's activities are managed by four committees, Organization, Promotion, Clean Safe and Green, Design, and Neighborhood Restructuring. A program manager assists in the program's implementation.
 Jordan Heights/Old Fairgrounds(N. 5th and 6th Streets from Gorden to Tilghman Streets south to north)The Old Fairgrounds Historic District was established on July 8, 1981 by City Ordinance #12314 and was certified by the Pennsylvania State Historical and Museum Commission on September 9, 1981. The district takes its name from the use of the area as the Lehigh County Agricultural Society's fairgrounds from 1852-1888. After the Society moved the fairgrounds to its current location at 17th and Chew Streets the land was auctioned off to developers. The area was developed in a mixture of housing styles with Victorian the most common.

East Side

 Dutch Hill(Residential areas of higher elevation on the southern portion of the East Side) Mainly residential area located between East Hamilton Street and the Lehigh River.
 East Allentown(Dauphin Street through the Lehigh River east to west, and the Lehigh River through E. Hamilton Street/Hanover Avenue south to north) A mix of both residential and industrial across the lower East Side of Allentown.
 Midway Manor (The Bethlehem city line through N. Sherman Street east to west, and Union Boulevard through E. Columbia Street south to north) Residential area with mostly detached and relatively larger houses than those in either Center City or the surrounding areas.
 Rittersville(The Bethlehem city line through N. Irving Street east to west, including neighborhoods along and adjacent to Hanover Avenue) Not originally incorporated with the city, Rittersville is mainly residential, but has a small recently remodelled shopping center. The neighborhood is also the former home to a psychiatric hospital, the Allentown State Hospital, now demolished.

South Side

 Alton Park(Southwest of Interstate 78 and north of Lehigh Street to the city line with Salisbury Township and Emmaus) Residential areas with some forest and park land.
 Cumberland Gardens(E. Cumberland Street from S. Carlisle Street to S. Filbert Street) Public housing area in the southeast area of Allentown, off of East Susquehanna Street.
 Lehigh Parkway(residential areas to the south and east of the Lehigh Parkway) Includes the area along the Jefferson Street corridor and Allentown Queen City Municipal Airport.
 Mountainville(southern tip of the city centered around South 4th Street and Emaus Avenue)  Named for the mountain that PA Route 145 travels over, this neighborhood is at the foot of the South Mountain. It contains a mix of businesses, industry, and residential areas. The former Mack Truck Headquarters are located nearby.

The Wards
 1st Ward (Lehigh River to Jordan Creek east to west, and the Little Lehigh Creek through Gordon Street south to north)The First Ward was created under the name "Lehigh Ward" on August 30, 1852. It was the first section annexed to Allentown beyond the original boundaries of the city as established by city founder William Allen in 1762.  The industrial sites near the Lehigh River were mostly abandoned by the turn of the 21st century and are now slowly undergoing redevelopment.
 6th Ward (Lehigh River to the Jordan Creek east to west, and Gordon Street through the city line south to north) A residential area with a mix of cultures. Houses are spaced farther apart as one nears Allentown/Whitehall border.
 The Waterfront (Opening approximately 2021)(Along the Lehigh River from Allen Street in the south to American Parkway in the north)The redevelopment will transform approximately 26 acres of abandoned industrial land along the west side of the Lehigh River into a unique and vibrant waterfront featuring offices, retail, restaurants, residential and other commercial uses.  With its half mile of direct river frontage, it will be the only location of its kind in the Lehigh Valley to offer unparalleled views of and direct access to the Lehigh River.

West End

 Hamilton Park(Union Terrace Park through the city line east to west, and the city line through Hamilton Street south to north) Residential areas on the West End south of Cedar Creek Park, including former Griesemersville.
 Trexler Park(All areas within the city limits west of Cedar Crest Boulevard)
 West End Theatre District (17th through 22nd Streets to the east and west, and Liberty through Washington Streets to the south and north)Also known as the 19th Street Theatre District, this area is Allentown’s most promising mixed use neighborhood. Centered on the Civic Theatre of Allentown’s two venues on 19th Street, the West End Theatre District is home to nearly 140 businesses. Within close proximity are Muhlenberg College, Lehigh Valley Health Network’s 17th Street Campus, and the Allentown Farmers Market. The opening of several boutique small businesses over the past several years has enhanced the neighborhood’s appeal as a specialty shopping destination.
 West Park Historic District(15th through 17th Streets east to west, and Hamilton through Chew Streets south to north plus the 1400 block of Linden Street) Attractions such as historic Victorian and Craftsman-style homes and a public park founded by General Harry Trexler in 1908 can be found here. West Park features a newly restored bandshell where the Allentown Band among others can be heard throughout the summer.
 West Walnut/Union Terrace(15th Street through Union Terrace Park east to west, North to Hamilton Streets and South to South Street) The West End Pharmacy, Seward's Steak Shop, and the former Hersh's Market are located in this southwest Allentown neighborhood of West Walnut, known to its residents as Union Terrace and often simply "UT." It is a small community of row homes, small apartment complexes, bungalow houses, and Victorian style homes. Union Terrace Elementary School and Francis D. Raub Middle School are also located inside the neighborhood.

References

External links
Allentown historic districts official website

Geography of Allentown, Pennsylvania
Allentown, Pennsylvania